The Brothers of Our Lady of Lourdes (FNDL) are a Roman Catholic religious congregation founded in 1830 by Belgian priest Étienne-Modeste Glorieux (1802-1872). The congregation is dedicated to education and formation of the youth, particularly in technical training.  The congregation was approved and given pontifical status by Pope Leo XIII in 1892.

Numbering 198 in 2009 the brothers are active in Belgium, the Netherlands, the Democratic Republic of Congo, Indonesia (as Bruder Budi Mulia), Ethiopia and Brazil.

References

External links 
 Brothers of Our Lady of Lourdes in ODIS - Online Database for Intermediary Structures 
 Archives of Brothers of Our Lady of Lourdes  in ODIS - Online Database for Intermediary Structures 

Catholic teaching orders
Catholic religious institutes established in the 19th century
Religious organizations established in 1830
1830 establishments in Belgium
Institutes of Catholic religious brothers